W.A.R.P.E.D. is a 2005 album by Savatage guitarist Chris Caffery. It is a concept album with every song dedicated to a facet of war. The majority of the songs already appeared on the second disc of the US edition of Caffery's first album, Faces.

Track listing
 "Home Is Where the Hell Is" - 7:02
 "God Damn War" - 6:34
 "Election Day" - 2:34
 "Erase" - 5:40
 "Fool, Fool!" - 2:57
 "Edge of Darkness" - 4:10
 "Saddamize" - 7:38
 "'I'" - 4:32
 "Iraq Attack" - 5:25
 "W.A.R.P.E.D." - 3:37
 "State of the Head" - 5:35
 "Amazing Grace" - 1:36
 "Piece Be with You" - 5:54
 "Beat Me, You'll Never Beat Me" - 6:00
 "Curtains" - 3:13

Credits
Chris Caffery - lead and backing vocals, all instruments, producer, engineer, mixing
Paul Morris - keyboards, piano
Dave Z - bass guitar
Jeff Plate - drums, percussion
Dave Eggar - cello
George Kokonas - lute, backing vocals
Jon Oliva - lead vocals on "Iraq Attack"
Brian Gregory - bass guitar on "Iraq Attack"
Nik Chinboukas - percussion, backing vocals, producer, engineer, mixing
Pete Benjamin - engineer

References

2005 albums
Chris Caffery albums
Concept albums